Explorer class may refer to:

Naval vessels
 , a series of container ships operated by CMA CGM.
 , a class of general purpose vessels operated by the Royal Australian Navy
 , a class of experimental submarines operated by the Royal Navy between 1958 and 1965

Fictional vessels

See also
 , a class of destroyers operated by the Regia Marina (Italian Navy) between 1929 and 1954, all of which are named after Italian explorers
 Explorer (disambiguation)#Maritime vessels for individual ships carrying the name Explorer